Dr. David Leimdörfer (September 17, 1851 – 4 November 1922) was a rabbi born in Hliník nad Vahom (also ,), Kingdom of Hungary, 17 September 1851.

He was educated at his native place and at Zsolna (today Žilina), Waitzen (Vác), Budapest, Pressburg (today Bratislava), and Vienna. He became a military chaplain in the Austro-Hungarian army; from 1875 to 1883 he was rabbi at Nordhausen (Thuringia), Prussia, and in 1883 he became rabbi at Hamburg Temple, where he was also principal of the school for religion and of the Jewish high school for girls. He died in 1922.

Literary works 
Leimdörfer's works include:
 Kurzgefasste Religionslehre der Israeliten, Nordhausen, 1876
 Die Kürzeste Darstellung der Nachbiblischen Gesch. für die Israelitische Schuljugend, ib. 1880 (4th ed. 1896)
 Die Chanuka Wunder, Magdeburg, 1888; and Die Lebende Megilla, Hamburg, 1888; both festival plays
 Der Hamburger Tempel, ib. 1889
 Das Heilige Schriftwerk Koheleth im Lichte der Gesch, ib. 1892
 Die Messias Apokalypse, Vienna, 1895
 Das Psalter Ego in den Ichpsalmen, Hamburg, 1898
 Zur Kritik des Buches Esther, Frankfurt, 1899
 Die Lösung des Koheleträtsels Durch Ibn Baruch, Berlin, 1900
 Der Altbiblische Priestersegen, Frankfurt, 1900

See also 
 Hamburg Temple

References

External links 
 
 https://web.archive.org/web/20070913012451/http://www1.uni-hamburg.de/rz3a035//police101.html/rothenbaumchaussee1.html
 Digitized works by Dávid Leimdörfer at the Leo Baeck Institute, New York

19th-century Hungarian rabbis
20th-century German rabbis
Hungarian Reform rabbis
German Reform rabbis
Rabbis in the military
Hungarian expatriates in Germany
People from Žiar nad Hronom District
People from Nordhausen, Thuringia
1851 births
1922 deaths
Hungarian military personnel
Rabbis from Hamburg